Jan Václav Josef Frierenberger (German: Johann Wenzel Joseph Ritter von Frierenberger) (1759-1823) was a general in the Austrian Empire army during the Napoleonic Wars.

Military career 
As an officer's son, he decided in his youth to serve in the army. He took part in the Austro-Turkish wars and in 1790 is already listed as a captain. His father Major Josef Frierenberger (1709-1773) was awarded the Military Order of Maria Theresa. After the Battle of Austerlitz he was, like his father, decorated on May 28, 1806 with the highest Austrian military decoration - Knight's Cross of the Military Order of Maria Theresa (this represented a claim to a lifetime peerage Knight (Ritter) and  eventually the holder could claim the hereditary title of free lord). He was promoted to  lieutenant colonel the following year and in 1809 to  colonel. Subsequently, on April 27, 1813, he  was promoted to major general. He was severely wounded on August 26, 1813, during the Battle of Dresden. Afterwards, the command of the artillery was taken over by General Friedrich Karl von Langenau. Subsequently, the Russian Tsar Alexander I awarded him the Russian Order of St. Anna. In January 1820 he was retired  and spent the last years of his life in Kroměříž, now Czech republic. He is buried in the old Kroměříž cemetery.

Monument near Austerlitz 
On December 2, 1995, a stone monument  near  the old post office along the Olomouc road was unveiled. It was built by the Czechoslovak Napoleonic Society together with the Austerlitz Battery to commemorate  two Austrian artillery batteries, which under the command of Major Václav Jan Frierenberger covered the retreat of the Russian corps of General Pyotr Bagration at the conclusion of the Battle of Austerlitz.

Cemetery monument 
In 1836  Frierenberger's widow had a monument built on her husband's grave. In 1936, the memorial was  relocated  to the current town cemetery entrance. The statue represents  a grieving woman leaning on a pedestal which is carrying a broken Doric column. There are German inscriptions on all four sides of the pedestal shaft honoring the general.

References 

1759 births
1823 deaths
Napoleonic Wars
Austrian generals
Czech generals
Knights Cross of the Military Order of Maria Theresa
Battle of Austerlitz
People from Český Krumlov